USS Naiad was a sternwheel paddle steamer of the Union Navy in the American Civil War. In Greek mythology, naiads are nymphs who lived in and gave life to lakes, rivers, springs, and fountains.

Built as Princess in 1863 at Freedom, Pennsylvania, the ship was purchased by the Navy from F. Martin at Cincinnati, Ohio, on 3 March 1864; and commissioned on 3 April 1864, Acting Master Harry T. Keene in command.

Service history
Acquired to bolster Union strength along the Mississippi River and its tributaries against Confederate cavalry and guerrilla raids, Naiad served in the shallow waters through the end of the American Civil War, from time to time fighting Southern shore batteries. Again on 2 September, she snuffed out the fire of a Confederate battery near Rowe's Landing, Louisiana. The constant patrol of the rivers by Naiad and her sister "tinclads" helped the Union to maintain open communications and supply lines in the West while preventing the South from mustering her resources to oppose Generals Sherman and Grant.

Naiad decommissioned at Cairo, Illinois, on 30 June 1865 and was sold at auction at Mound City, Illinois to B. F. Beansly, on 17 August 1865. Renamed Princess in post-war civilian service, she struck a snag and sank at Napoleon, Missouri, on 1 June 1868.

See also

Anaconda Plan
Mississippi Squadron

References

External links 
history.navy.mil/USNSH: USS Naiad

Ships of the Union Navy
Ships built in Pennsylvania
Steamships of the United States Navy
Gunboats of the United States Navy
American Civil War patrol vessels of the United States
Shipwrecks of the Missouri River
1863 ships
Steamboats of the Missouri River
Maritime incidents in June 1868